Luciano Negrini (22 June 1920 – 12 December 2012) was an Italian rower who competed in the 1936 Summer Olympics. He was born in Venice. In 1936 he won the silver medal as coxswain of the Italian boat in the coxed pairs event.

References

 Luciano Negrini's profile at Sports Reference.com

1920 births
2012 deaths
Italian male rowers
Coxswains (rowing)
Olympic rowers of Italy
Rowers at the 1936 Summer Olympics
Olympic silver medalists for Italy
Sportspeople from Venice
Olympic medalists in rowing
Medalists at the 1936 Summer Olympics